Sounds of Sand (original title Si le vent soulève les sables, literally "If the Wind Raises the Sands") is a drama film directed by Marion Hänsel about a family in the Horn of Africa making a trek to find sufficient water during a drought. The film is a Belgium-France coproduction, released in 2006. It is based on the novel Chamelle by Marc Durin-Valois.

Cast
Isaka Sawadogo as Rahne
Carole Karemera as	Mouna
Asma Nouman Aden as Shasha
Emile Abossolo M'Bo as Lassong

External links
Official web site of the film

Film festival program note

2006 films
Belgian drama films
Films based on French novels
Films set in Africa
Films directed by Marion Hänsel
French drama films
2000s French films